George McNaught Bartholomew (March 12, 1812April 11, 1885) was an American farmer, surveyor, and Wisconsin pioneer.  He was one of the founders of Lodi, Wisconsin, and served one term in the Wisconsin State Assembly, representing western Columbia County.

He was the son of American major general Joseph Bartholomew.  His son, also named Joseph Bartholomew, was the 2nd chief justice of the North Dakota Supreme Court.

Biography
George Bartholomew was the son of American major general Joseph Bartholomew, a pioneer settler of Indiana.  George Bartholomew was born in Clark County, Indiana, in March 1812.  At age 21, he went west to McLean County, Illinois, where he was married.

In the spring of 1844, he visited the Wisconsin Territory and reviewed lands in the Lodi and Portage region of Columbia County.  The following spring, he and his elder half-brother, Marston Clarke Bartholomew, set out to establish a settlement at Lodi.  At the time of their settlement, the nearest post office was twenty miles south, in Madison. Their families followed in the Fall, along with their younger brother William Milton Bartholomew.  George Bartholomew's daughter, Josephine, was said to be the first white child born at Lodi.

The Bartholomews participated in the organizing of the town government in 1846.  In 1847, he was elected to the three-member county board of commissioners—the board of commissioners was the government for Columbia County prior to Wisconsin's statehood.  After Wisconsin became a state, he was elected county surveyor in 1854, 1872, and 1876.  He also served as chairman of the county board of supervisors in 1865, 1869, and 1870.

In 1856, Bartholomew was elected to the Wisconsin State Assembly on the Republican ticket.  He represented Columbia County's 1st Assembly district—the western parts of the county.

Personal life and family
Bartholomew's father Joseph Bartholomew, volunteered for service in the American Revolutionary War at only ten years old and rose to the rank of major general after distinguishing himself in the War of 1812.

George Bartholomew married Susan C. Hefner in 1833 at McLean County, Illinois.  They had at least eight children.  Their son Joseph Milton Bartholomew became one of the first justices of the North Dakota Supreme Court, and was the 2nd chief justice.

The Bartholomews were active with the Methodist church and led the effort to establish the church in Lodi.

References

External links
 

1812 births
1885 deaths
Republican Party members of the Wisconsin State Assembly